Pedro Bernaldez de Sahagun (12th-century) was a medieval knight of Castile.

His wife was María Soares da Maia, daughter of Suero Mendez de Amaya.

References 

12th-century births
12th-century nobility from León and Castile
Spanish Roman Catholics